Liberty Creek High School is one of three public high schools in Gallatin, Tennessee.

History
By 2018, Gallatin had five schools at or over capacity: Howard Elementary School, Station Camp Elementary School, Station Camp Middle School, Rucker Stewart Middle School, and Gallatin High School. In response, Sumner County Schools released plans for a new cluster of schools in October 2019, which included Liberty Creek High School, along with an elementary school and a middle school of the same name. 

The school board unanimously approved a construction bid for the campus in November 2019. Phillip Holt was chosen to be Liberty Creek's first principal. The school opened on August 1, 2022, serving students from grades 6–12. Students in grades 6–8, under leadership of Jason Bennett as principal, will move to Liberty Creek Middle School once construction is completed.

References

External links
 

Educational institutions established in 2022
Schools in Sumner County, Tennessee